The Úrvalsdeild Karla Player of the Year is an award for the top-tier basketball league in Iceland, the men's Úrvalsdeild. It was first awarded in 1968, to Birgir Örn Birgis, and the first trophy was given by Dave Zinkoff of the Philadelphia 76ers. From 1979, the award has been given to both the domestic and foreign player of the year.

All-time award winners
The following is a list of the all-time Úrvalsdeild Players of the Year winners.

1968-1978

1979–present

References

External links
Icelandic Basketball Federation Official Website 

European basketball awards
Basketball most valuable player awards
Úrvalsdeild karla (basketball)